Devil in the Flesh 2 (also known as Teacher's Pet) is a 2000 erotic thriller film directed by Marcus Spiegel. It is a sequel to Devil in the Flesh (1998), which stars Rose McGowan.

Plot
Debbie Strong, a beautiful psychopath, escapes from the mental institution she was sent off to in the first installment of the series. After a teenage girl who took Debbie in her car dies when retreating from Debbie and accidentally impaling herself, Debbie steals both the girl's identity and her car, and heads off to the college the dead girl was supposed to attend as a freshman.

There, Debbie instantly develops a psychotic crush on her dashing writing professor, Dr. Sam Deckner after being impressed by their shared interests as well as his personality on their first interaction. Debbie assumed the role of a wealthy man's daughter while going by the deceased girl's name "Tracy Carlay" as her new identity. She is checked into same room with Laney, a naive girl who she soon influences. Further interactions with Sam renders Debbie further psychotic and in order to strengthen their love she soon begins killing anyone who she believes served as a threat to their perceived relationship.

Laney, her computer-literate roommate discovers the truth about Debbie's past, and instantly panics then falls to her death after being agitated by Debbie's presence. Debbie described this as a suicide to the cops and soon begins to stalk Sam, unable to move on from their earlier intimate encounter. She repeatedly threatens Carla, Sam's girlfriend, especially after Carla revealed to Sam she was pregnant by him. Debbie, out of jealousy,  throws a stone at the glass window while the couple were getting intimate and prompted a police inquiry.

Debbie becomes more unhinged and at night, goes over to Carla's house, finds a knife and lurked around, intent on murdering Carla but is hindered by the presence of two cops both of whom she wounded before inadvertently stabbing herself in a scuffle with Sam.

The film ends with a stabbed Debbie being picked off the road by the father of the real Tracy Carlay, the teenage girl who had picked up Debbie in the film's opening. Tracy's father comments on Debbie's striking resemblance with his daughter and made mention of his daughter's troubles at school.

Cast
 Jodi Lyn O'Keefe as Debbie Strong/Tracy Carlay
 Jsu Garcia as Sam Deckner
 Sarah Lancaster as Tracy Carlay
 Katherine Kendall as Carla Briggs
 Jeanette Brox as Laney
 Christiana Frank as Sydney Hollings
 Todd Robert Anderson as Deputy Toby Taylor
 Bill Gratton as Sheriff Bill Taylor

References

External links
 
 

2000 films
2000 independent films
2000 thriller films
2000s erotic thriller films
American erotic thriller films
American independent films
American sequel films
Canadian erotic thriller films
Canadian independent films
Canadian sequel films
English-language Canadian films
2000s English-language films
2000s American films
2000s Canadian films